The discography of Italian recording artist Marco Mengoni consists of seven studio albums, two live albums, six extended plays, twenty-two singles, one promotional single, and twenty music videos. 
Mengoni reached commercial success in Italy when his first single, "Dove si vola", released after he won the third series of Italian talent show X Factor, debuted at number one on the FIMI Top Digital Downloads in December 2009. The EP with the same title entered the top 10 in Italy, and it was later certified platinum.

In 2010, Mengoni hit number one on the Italian albums chart with his second extended play, Re matto, and with the live album Re matto live. His first full-length studio set, Solo 2.0, was released in 2011, and it became his third consecutive number one. In 2013, Mengoni released the single "L'essenziale", which won the 63rd Sanremo Music Festival and represented Italy in the Eurovision Song Contest. The single topped the Italian Top Digital Downloads chart for eight consecutive weeks, and it became a minor hit in other European countries, including Switzerland, Spain and the Netherlands. Mengoni's second studio album, #prontoacorrere, was released in March 2013.

Starting from January 2015, Mengoni released a multi-albums project, including the studio sets Parole in circolo and Le cose che non ho, and the live recording Marco Mengoni Live (2016). The albums spawned several singles, including the Italian number-ones "Guerriero" and "Ti ho voluto bene veramente".

Albums

Studio albums

Live albums

Extended plays

Singles

Promotional singles

Other charted songs

Other appearances

Music videos

Notes
A  According to FIMI's criteria for compiling the Italian Albums Chart, the albums Materia (Terra) and Materia (Pelle) are considered as a single entry.
B  The EPs Dove si vola and Re matto charted on the Italian FIMI Albums chart, while #prontoacorrerespain was only eligible to chart on the Italian FIMI Top Digital Downloads chart, peaking at number 18.
C  "L'essenziale" did not chart on the Walloon Ultratop 50, but charted at number 27 on the Walloon Ultratip chart, which acts as an extension to the Ultratop 50.
D  "L'essenziale" did not chart on the Flemish Ultratop 50, but charted at number 31 on the Flemish Ultratip chart, which acts as an extension to the Ultratop 50.

References

Discographies of Italian artists